Harry S. Toy (1892 – September 9, 1955) was an American politician, prosecutor, and judge.

He served as Wayne County prosecutor (1930–1935), Michigan attorney general (1935), and a justice of the Michigan Supreme Court (1935–1937).

In November 1936, Toy, a Republican, was defeated for reelection to the Michigan Supreme Court by Democrat Bert D. Chandler, by a vote of 862,147 to 755,227. Toy later served as the commissioner of the Detroit Police Department from 1948 through 1950.

Both as a prosecutor and as police commissioner, Toy subscribed to McCarthyism and sought to root out and destroy communism, which Toy blamed for labor activism and various societal ills.

Toy planned to run for Governor of Michigan, but died of a heart attack at age 63 in Detroit.

References

1892 births
1955 deaths
Justices of the Michigan Supreme Court
Michigan Attorneys General
Michigan Republicans
20th-century American judges
Detroit Police Department chiefs